The 1911–12 Georgetown Hoyas men's basketball team represented Georgetown University during the 1911–12 NCAA college basketball season. James Colliflower coached the team in his first season as head coach. Georgetown was an independent and – except for two early games at Ryan Gymnasium on the Georgetown campus – played its home games at the Arcade Rink, also known as the Arcadia and as the Arcade Auditorium, in Washington, D.C. It finished the season with a record of 11-6.

A forward and letterman for Georgetown for three seasons while attending Georgetown University Law School, new head coach Colliflower would coach the Hoyas for three seasons, shepherding the team through disputes over it between the undergraduate campus and the Law School. He would compile an overall record of 32-17 before retiring after the 1913-14 season to concentrate on his coal delivery business and to make way for Georgetown's first full-time head coach, John O'Reilly. After O'Reilly fell ill and was unable to coach during the 1921-22 season, however, Colliflower would return for one last season as head coach – without pay – and improve his overall record to 43-20 before leaving coaching for good.

Season recap
Senior forward-center Frank Schlosser led the team in scoring for the fourth straight year, the first man to do so and one of only three men to do so in the first 100 years of Georgetown basketball history. He played in 15 games and scored 159 points averaging 10.1 points per game, half the team's average of 20.2 per game. He finished his collegiate career with 601 points and an average of 10.4 points per game, one of only three men to average in double figures over his career at Georgetown between the 1906-07 and 1942-43 seasons, the "Vintage Era" of Georgetown men's basketball.

Sophomore forward Ronayne "Roy" Waldron was a walk-on who had been called up to the varsity the previous season to play in seven games as a reserve, otherwise playing on the Collegians, an undergraduate team (in an era when the varsity program centered around Georgetown University Law School students) that played against local teams in the Washington, D.C., area. This season, still with the Collegians, he was called up to the varsity again and played in nine games, starting seven of them. He scored a total of 40 points for the season, averaging 4.4 points per game, but he scored a career-high 17 points in a game against Virginia. That performance made him a letterman and, after Schlosser graduated, he would become the team's leading scorer for the next two seasons and one of the top offensive producers of the early years of Georgetown basketball.

Roster
Sources

Georgetown players did not wear numbers on their jerseys this season. The first numbered jerseys in Georgetown men's basketball history would not appear until the 1933-34 season.

1911–12 schedule and results
Sources

It was common practice at this time for colleges and universities to include non-collegiate opponents in their schedules, with the games recognized as part of their official record for the season, and the December 11, 1911, game against Baltimore Medical College counted as part of Georgetown's won-loss record for 1911–12. It was not until 1952, after the completion of the 1951–52 season, that the National Collegiate Athletic Association (NCAA) ruled that colleges and universities could no longer count games played against non-collegiate opponents in their annual won-loss records.

|-
!colspan=9 style="background:#002147; color:#8D817B;"| Regular season

Notes

References

Georgetown Hoyas men's basketball seasons
Georgetown
Georgetown Hoyas men's basketball team
Georgetown Hoyas men's basketball team